Table for Six (lit: Heart Attack) is a 2022 Hong Kong comedy film written and directed by Sunny Chan. It was written as a sequel to the 2015 short film Table for Three. Centered around the classically Chinese motifs of shared meals and dysfunctional family ties, this melodramatic comedy starring Dayo Wong, Stephy Tang, Louis Cheung and Ivana Wong was initially scheduled to release on 1 February 2022, the first day of Lunar New Year, but it was postponed due to COVID-19 and finally it was released on 8 September 2022.

It was selected at 24th edition of Far East Film Festival held from April 22 to 30 2022, where it had its world premiere and was nominated for Best Screenplay Award. Later it was also invited to the 21st New York Asian Film Festival in crowd pleasures section, where it had its North American premiere on 23 July.

Synopsis
In this melodramatic comedy, three brothers reside in a home that they inherited from their late parents. The eldest brother Steve, theoretically is the man of the house, but he constantly is getting dissed by his two younger brothers Bernard and Lung for the decisions he makes, the inedible meals that he cooks, and his complicated romantic encounters. To prepare for a family reunion dinner, Steve seeks the help of Lung’s girlfriend and foodie Josephine and in doing so, wins back their hearts for a while, until his old flame and Bernard’s new girlfriend Monica shows up. That’s a recipe for a disaster waiting to explode! The unexpected visit of Steve’s part-time girlfriend, sexy web idol 'Meow', not only fails to turn down the heat and cool the awkward situation, but stirs up the sibling conflict even further. (From New York Asian Film Festival)

Cast
 Dayo Wong	as Chen Hong
 Stephy Tang as Monica	
 Louis Cheung as Chen Li
 Ivana Wong as Josephine
 Lin Min-Chen as Ah Meow
 Peter Chan Charm Man as Chen Xi
 Fish Liew as the unnamed mother of Chen Li and Chen Xi
 Rik Ching as Esports teammate

In addition to the main cast, Louis Koo, Kenny Wong, Jennifer Yu, Tony Wu, Louise Wong, Philip Keung, Locker Lam, Anson Chan, Ng Siu Hin and Ling Man Lung make cameo appearances in a promotional easter egg.

Release
The film initially slated to release on 1 February 2022 was postponed due to COVID-19 and finally it was released on 8 September 2022. It was selected at 24th edition of Far East Film Festival held from April 22 to 30 2022.

It was invited at the 21st New York Asian Film Festival, where it was screened at Asia Society on July 23 for its North American premiere.

Reception

Box office
Table for Six has grossed a total of US$19.75 million worldwide combining its box office gross from Hong Kong (US$5.53), and China (US$15.79 million).

 the film is the second highest-grossing, Hong Kong-produced film released in the year 2022 with gross of HK$42,961,378.

In the five weeks since the opening of the film, the cumulative box office exceeded 74.54 million Hong Kong dollars, breaking the box office record of Anita of 62.52 million, becoming the No. 3 highest-grossing Chinese film in Hong Kong.

Critical response
Tara Judah of Screen Daily reviewing the film for  Far East Film Festival stated that "Sunny Chan serves up a light-hearted, soft-boiled comedy about misguided romance." Concluding Judah wrote, "Chan plays every narrative beat for laughs. While this approach makes the film easy to digest, it also means it misses out on the emotional payoff that comes with slightly higher – or at least somewhat consequential – stakes."

Accolades

References

External links
 
 
 
 
 
 

2022 films
2022 comedy films
2020s Cantonese-language films
Hong Kong comedy films
Films set in Hong Kong
Films postponed due to the COVID-19 pandemic